Bonk is the debut studio album by Australian rock band Big Pig. It was released in May 1988 on White Label Records and peaked at number 5 on The Australian charts. The album was released in America by A&M Records in 1988. "Breakaway" was featured on the Bill & Ted's Excellent Adventure soundtrack

Track listing 
All songs written by O. Witer, A. Scaglione, N. Disbray, and S. Abeyratne, except where noted, according to Australasian Performing Right Association (APRA).

 "Iron Lung" - 3:34
 "Hungry Town" - 3:06
 "Tin Drum" - 4:22
 "Breakaway" (Gary Zekley, Mitch Bottler) - 3:38
 "Boy Wonder" - 3:26
 "Big Hotel" (O. Witer, A. Scaglione, N. Disbray and T. Rosewarne) - 4:14
 "Hellbent Heaven" (O. Witer, S. Abeyratne, A Antoniades and N. Baker) - 3:27
 "Nation" - 3:34
 "Charlie" - 4:03
 "Fine Thing" - 3:22
 "Money God" - 4:28
 "Devil's Song" - 5:27
 "Breakaway" (Popper Mix) (Zekley, Bottler) - 6:01
 "Hungry Town" (Grub Club Mix) - 6:27

Charts

Weekly charts

Year-end charts

Certifications

Personnel 
Credited to:

Big Pig
 Tony Antoniades - Harmonica, Vocals
 Neil Baker - Drums
 Nick Disbray - Percussion, Vocals
 Tim Rosewarne - Keyboards, Vocals
 Adrian Scaglione - Drums
 Sherine Abeyratne - Percussion, Vocals
 Oleh Witer - Drums, Vocals

Additional musicians
 Como String Quartet - Strings (Track 9)

Recording details
 Producer — Nick Launay 
 Engineer — Nick Launay 
 Assistants — Heidi Cannave, Noel Haris, Michael Wickow 
 Mixer — Nick Launay

Art work
 Art Direction & Design - Oleh Witer, Jeremy Pearce 
 Photography — Eric Watson 
 Video Photography - Eric Watson, Robert Ogilvie

Notes

 A "Boy Wonder" was recorded in Sydney separately to the album which was recorded in Melbourne, Nick Launay was assisted by Heidi Cannova on this track

References 

1988 debut albums
Big Pig albums
Albums produced by Nick Launay